Piz Miez (also known as Cimalmotta) is a mountain of the Oberhalbstein Alps, located on the border between Italy and Switzerland. It lies west of Lago di Lei, on the chain that culminates at Piz Timun.

References

External links
 Piz Miez on Hikr

Mountains of the Alps
Mountains of Switzerland
Mountains of Italy
Italy–Switzerland border
International mountains of Europe
Mountains of Graubünden
Two-thousanders of Switzerland
Ferrera